Newfound is a hamlet in the Basingstoke and Deane district of Hampshire, England.  Its nearest town is Basingstoke, which lies approximately 4.1 miles (6.6 km) east from the hamlet.

Governance
The hamlet is part of the civil parish of Oakley, and is part of the Oakley and North Waltham ward of Basingstoke and Deane borough council. The borough council is a Non-metropolitan district of Hampshire County Council.

References

Villages in Hampshire